Roman Republican governors of Gaul were assigned to the province of Cisalpine Gaul (northern Italy) or to Transalpine Gaul, the Mediterranean region of present-day France also called the Narbonensis, though the latter term is sometimes reserved for a more strictly defined area administered from Narbonne (ancient Narbo). Latin Gallia can also refer in this period to greater Gaul independent of Roman control, covering the remainder of France, Belgium, and parts of the Netherlands and Switzerland, often distinguished as Gallia Comata and including regions also known as Celtica (Κελτική in Strabo and other Greek sources), Aquitania, Belgica, and Armorica (Brittany). To the Romans, Gallia was a vast and vague geographical entity distinguished by predominately Celtic inhabitants, with "Celticity" a matter of culture as much as speaking gallice ("in Celtic").

The Latin word provincia (plural provinciae) originally referred to a task assigned to an official or to a sphere of responsibility within which he was authorized to act, including a military command attached to a specified theater of operations. The assignment of a provincia defined geographically thus did not always imply annexation of the territory under Roman rule. Provincial administration as such originated in efforts to stabilize an area in the aftermath of war, and only later was the provincia a formal, pre-existing administrative division regularly assigned to promagistrates. The provincia of Gaul therefore began as a military command, at first defensive and later expansionist. Independent Gaul was invaded by Julius Caesar in the 50s BC and organized under Roman administration by Augustus; see Roman Gaul for Gallic provinces in the Imperial era.

Early Republican wars with the Gauls

The early history of Romano-Celtic relations begins during a period of Gallic expansionism on the Italian peninsula, with the capture of Rome by Gauls in 390 BC (or more likely 387) and the suspiciously fortuitous rescue of the city by Camillus after the Romans had already surrendered. The Gauls who fought at the Battle of the Allia and captured Rome are most often identified as Senones. Over the next hundred years, the Gauls appear in classical sources as allies of the Etruscans and Samnites, but sometimes as invaders. Battles occur on Roman territory and on that held by Etruscans; by Italic peoples who later become Roman allies (socii) willingly or under compulsion; and by the Gauls themselves. The defeat of the Senonian stronghold Sena (or Senigallia) in 283 leads to nearly fifty years of mostly peaceful relations between Romans and Celts.

The accounts of these early military conflicts, written by Greek and Roman historians, are complicated by overlays of legend and moralizing. Although stereotypes of impetuous barbarians prevail, among the various historians the Gauls are sometimes portrayed as acting with honour, bravery, or respect, even in the face of Roman treachery. A priest named Fabius Dorsuo is said to have been allowed by the Gauls to carry out religious rituals during the siege of Rome; three Fabii occasioned outrage on both sides when they abused their responsibilities as ambassadors to the Gauls, and were even accused of having brought about the attack through their actions. Romans cast themselves as underdogs in hand-to-hand combat with physically superior Celts, to such an extent that guile or divine aid is seen as the most likely explanation when a Roman manages to win: T. Manlius earns the nickname (cognomen) Torquatus by outsmarting a Gaul in single combat and stripping him of his torque; M. Valerius Corvus got his cognomen when a divinely-sent raven (corvus) distracted his opponent. Regardless of factuality, these stories contributed to the fashioning of a distinctly Roman identity in relation to a Gallic "Other."

As the only foreign enemy to have taken the city, the Gauls represented a "Celtic threat" that loomed large in the Roman imagination for more than 300 years. Cicero could still malign Catiline in 63 BC with an accusation of plotting the overthrow of the government with the aid of Celtic armed forces. The fear and dread of inferiority engendered by the Gallic sack of Rome became enshrined in Roman foreign policy and myth as a virtually infinite quest to secure an ever-larger periphery; in his war against the Gauls and invasion of Celtic Britain, Caesar as proconsul could present himself as pursuing the old grudge to what Romans saw as literally the end of the world.

Dictatores and Celtic Italy
The following table shows Early Republican military commanders against the Gauls on the Italian peninsula. These men were granted imperium as consuls and praetors, the highest elected offices in Roman government, and also as dictatores. The dictatorship most likely originated as a military office; both Cicero and Livy thought that its purpose was to ensure strategic oversight and unified command in wartime — the dictator is he who gives the word (dictum). The Roman custom that a commander had to lay down arms outside the city limits (pomerium) before entering also suggests how the powers of the dictator originally might have been restricted within the civil realm; he could not, for instance, override the people's tribunes. The dictator was nominated by a consul, not elected, and he was expected to step aside when the job was done, with a limit of six months considered standard. In contrast to the annual magistracies set by the religio-astronomical calendar, this six-month term coincides with the usual length of the military campaigning season, given its seasonality in antiquity. In 332 (see table), for instance, a dictator was nominated specifically in anticipation of a Gallic war, which in the event never materialized. In 360, a dictator had been named to quell the Celtic crisis (Gallicus tumultus); one of the consuls that year had the specific task (provincia) of dealing with the Gallic alliance based in Tibur (modern-day Tivoli). Both commanders succeeded in their missions, but only the constitutionally elected consul was granted the honour of a triumph. The dictatores continued most often to have a military role into the Middle Republic, but when Sulla revived the office in the late 80s, it had fallen into disuse for more than a century, in part because a system had developed for assigning provincial commands with administrative oversight as a result of permanent annexations of territories.

Table of commanders in Italo-Gallic wars

Annexing Cisalpine Gaul

The Roman takeover of Cisalpine Gaul, or "Gaul on this side of the Alps," was a gradual process of long duration. "It was in Liguria, in the Celtic lands of the Po Valley, and in Venetia and Histria," notes Fergus Millar in his classic essay "The Political Character of the Classical Roman Republic, 200–151 B.C.," "that the Romans of this period exhibited a consistent and unremitting combination of imperialism, militarism, expansionism, and colonialism." Although sources for much of the period are sketchy, with the exception of Polybius, it becomes nearly impossible to argue that Rome acted only defensively: "Rome's wars in the north of the Italian peninsula" — not only against the Gauls, but the Etruscans and the Italic peoples — "were largely of her own devising." Provincial assignments and military actions involving Liguria, Venetia, and Istria (Histria) are included in the table below when related directly to Gaul.

The Ager Gallicus
The defeat of the Senones and Boii in the late 280s had brought the occupation of the Ager Gallicus along the Adriatic and the establishment of the first Roman colony in previously Gallic territory. The ager Gallicus, formerly in the possession of the Senones, was the land between Ariminum and Picenum, and was the first territory acquired by Rome in Cispadane Gaul.

Since that time, good relations between Rome and its Gallic neighbors had extended into a fifth decade. Polybius says that the lex Flaminia agraria of 232, which provided for the distribution of land in the Ager Gallicus to Roman citizens, threatened the existing peace with Gauls such as the Boii who bordered the ager. Ostensibly, this land had been ager publicus, that is, owned by the public; in practice, it was exploited for the benefit of the senatorial elite, who objected vehemently to the redistribution program.

The first Roman colonies in northern Italy were established in 218, but not until the end of the 2nd century could the Romans claim firm control of the region all the way to the Alps. After a series of decisive victories against Gauls and Ligurians in 200, provinciae pertaining to the Gauls take on an increasingly diplomatic and administrative character.

The province of Cisalpina at first was one of the military commands that might be assigned to the two consuls and six praetors before the territory had been annexed. A military command (imperium) was sometimes extended past a magistrate's one-year term of elected office for a year or two (see prorogatio); this prorogation allowed Rome to maintain continuity in ongoing military operations under experienced officers while still controlling and limiting the number of individuals authorized to hold command.

After major military operations had ceased, the commander's abilities as an administrator were put to the test. In the absence of an ideal leader who was both a bold and experienced general and a masterful diplomat and meticulous administrator, provincial governorships were liable to exploitive practices of self-enrichment that damaged the legitimacy of Roman rule. Governed peoples had recourse through Roman courts for unjust acts committed against them by their governors, but because the case had to be presented by a Roman citizen, usually a patronus with a family history of relations to the offended parties, these prosecutions were almost always politicized. As the number of citizens in a province increased, so too their connections to powerful families in Rome and the network of mutual obligations from which they could expect to benefit.

By the late Republic, Cisalpina of all the Roman provinces had the greatest number of citizens in its population; although the difficulties of travel might stand in the way of participating in Roman elections, northern Italy offered significant blocs of voters for Romans who cultivated their clients well. Popularist politicians in particular were associated with the cause of extending citizenship to the disenfranchised, and were accused by the conservative oligarchs of doing so merely to build loyalty and acquire votes. Toward the end of the Social War in 89, all free men in Cisalpine Gaul south of the Po River (Latin Padus) — that is, Cispadane Gaul, "Gaul on this side of the Po" — had become entitled to Roman citizenship.

Many Transpadanes, or residents of Cisalpina north of the Po, were Romans or held Latin rights, but the issue of blanket citizenship was not fully resolved until 49, with the passage of a law by Caesar. After 42 BC, Cisalpina was so thoroughly incorporated into the Roman system of government that it was no longer assigned as a province; the region was administered directly from Rome and by the same forms of municipal government as the rest of the Italian peninsula.

In Latin sources before ca. 100 BC, Gallia is a flexible word that refers often to Cisalpine Gaul alone, but sometimes to Gaul as an indefinite totality and sometimes in a very limited sense to only Cispadane Gaul. The following table lists consuls, praetors and promagistrates — no dictatores are recorded against the Gauls — assigned to Gallia until 125 BC, when the administration of Cisalpina should be considered in light of actions in Transalpine Gaul. After 197 BC, commanders of praetorian rank are no longer assigned to Liguria or against the Gauls; military operations in northern Italy are usually conducted by both consuls during this period, or one consul if another war was being waged abroad.

Table of Gallic provinciae through 126 BC

Transalpine Gaul

Gallia Transalpina at first could refer broadly to "Gaul on the other side of the Alps," but after the conquest of Mediterranean Gaul in the 120s BC came to specify the Roman province in the south (Provincia nostra, "our Province," hence Provence). Because the term Transalpina had a history of usage in the more general sense, the province was often called the Narbonensis, after the colonial headquarters in Narbonne. The establishment of the Transalpine province is usually dated to the military victories of Domitius Ahenobarbus and Quintus Fabius Maximus over the Arverni and Allobroges in the 120s, and the refounding of Narbo as a Roman colony in 118 BC. Evidence is scant, however, that Transalpina was assigned as a province over the next 15 years, until the Cimbrian invasions compelled the Romans to take action. There may have been no regular administration until after the victories of Gaius Marius in 101 BC. The historical record of Transalpine promagistracies continues to be sketchy until the 60s, with a few exceptions such as Valerius Flaccus's tenure ca. 85–81 BC, one of the longest known Gallic governorships.

During the Republic, the provinces of Cisalpina and Transalpina were governed sometimes jointly, sometimes separately; Caesar was allotted both provinces, and in his first five-year term divided his time between military campaigns in Transalpina and administrative duties in Cisalpina during the winter months. One factor in the Roman drive to control southern Gaul had been the desire for a secure land route to the Iberian peninsula (Hispania), where the Celtiberians (Celtiberi) also spoke a form of Celtic or a language closely related to it, with at least some cultural similarities to the other Celts. Hispania Citerior and Hispania Ulterior had been administered as provinces since 197 BC as a result of the Second Punic War, which also had ignited the first direct if postponed Roman interest in southern Gaul; the first Roman colonies had also been established in Cisalpine Gaul during this time.

In the table following, when a governor is listed for Cisalpina only, he may also have governed Transalpina in the absence of another known official, and vice versa; at times, however, Hispania Citerior and Transalpina were governed jointly instead. Political and military factors determined whether and how these provincial assignments were combined, including shifting alliances among those governed, strategic considerations during the Social Wars and Roman civil wars, the availability of experienced administrators and commanders, and jockeying to maintain a balance of power among Roman oligarchs. Following the civil wars of the 40s, Narbonensis seems to refer specifically to the established province in southern Gaul, while Transalpina may include new territories claimed through Caesar's military campaigns in formerly independent Celtica and formally organized later by Augustus.

Table of Gallic governors 125–42 BC

Triumviral years
In the tumultuous period following Caesar's death, during the ascendancy of the Second Triumvirate, Gaul was acted upon by various commanders, until M. Vipsanius Agrippa arrived as proconsul in 39 to quell unrest. Scholars have paid relatively scant attention to the question of why Gaul failed to take advantage of Rome's disarray during the civil wars of the 40s and 30s to revolt in toto; it is sometimes assumed that the population was too decimated to take a stand, but the numbers in so far as they are known make this unlikely. In 57, for instance, Caesar had reported that the Nervii had 50,000 men of fighting age; he supposed that only 500 survived the Battle of the Sabis, but five years later they were able to provide a force of 5,000 men. Although the figures may be unreliable in the absolute, they indicate the resilience of the population. In 52, after the surrender of the pan-Gallic army at Alesia, Caesar had granted amnesty to the armies of both the Arverni and Aedui, each of which he estimated at 30,000 men, and sent them home. After the failure of Vercingetorix's strategy of massing allied forces, the surviving Gallic leaders had continued to wage a guerrilla war with some success and hope of attrition, until Marcus Antonius (Mark Antony) came to an arrangement with the last Celtic king known to retain his independence, Commius of the Atrebates, who had led the relief forces at Alesia. Over the course of the following two decades, Gallic losses in the 50s would have been replaced by the maturation of the male population, while available Roman forces were largely occupied by fighting each other. The Gauls may have imagined that the Romans would weaken themselves in civil war to such an extent that a rebellion was moot or not worth the trouble; Caesar reports that the Gauls kept themselves informed about political events in Rome that might affect them.

In 44 BC, Antony was the proconsul assigned to both Cisalpina and Transalpina; his ability to come to an understanding with the Gauls, as demonstrated by his arrangements with Commius, is further indicated by the willingness of a Sequanian leader to execute Decimus Brutus at his behest. This Brutus had served in Gaul under Caesar from 56 (or earlier). Although his experience in Gallic relations exceeded that of his peer Antony, whose earliest appearance in Caesar's account of the war is around the time of the Battle of Alesia, Celtic antipathy may have been spurred by Brutus's betrayal of Caesar, given the high value Celts placed on loyalty to their sworn leaders.

Broughton lists no Gallic governors after Agrippa through 31, the year with which The Magistrates of the Roman Republic concludes. Augustus began to reorganize Transalpine Gaul with its newly conquered territories into administrative regions in 27 BC.

Selected bibliography
A.L.F. Rivet, Gallia Narbonensis: Southern France in Roman Times (London, 1988)
 Charles Ebel, Transalpine Gaul: The Emergence of a Roman Province (Brill, 1976)
 T. Corey Brennan, The Praetorship in the Roman Republic (Oxford University Press, 2000)
 Andrew Lintott, The Constitution of the Roman Republic (Oxford University Press, 1999)
 Unless otherwise noted, the sources for promagistracies in Gaul and their dates is T.R.S. Broughton, The Magistrates of the Roman Republic (New York: American Philological Association, 1951, 1986), vols. 1–3, abbreviated MRR1, MRR2 and MRR3.

References

Roman Republic
Roman governors of Gaul
Gaul